FK Metalac Gornji Milanovac is a professional football club based in Gornji Milanovac, Serbia.

Managers

References

External links
 

 
Metalac Gornji Milanovac